Amancio is a municipality and town in the Las Tunas Province of Cuba. It is located in the south-western part of the province, and opens to the Gulf of Guacanayabo to the south.

Demographics
In 2004, Amancio had a population of 41,523.

See also
Municipalities of Cuba
List of cities in Cuba

References

External links

Populated places in Las Tunas Province